CHK Racing (formerly Mike Harmon Racing, Elite 2 Racing and Richardson-Netzloff-Harmon Racing) is an American professional stock car racing team that fields the No. 74 Chevrolet Camaro full-time and the No. 47 Chevrolet Camaro part-time in the NASCAR Xfinity Series. The team has also competed in the NASCAR Craftsman Truck Series and the ARCA Menards Series in the past.

Mike Harmon initially owned the team with two other co-owners, Donnie Richardson and Eddie Netzloff, in its first two years and the team was known as Richardson-Netzloff-Harmon Racing in 2007 and then Elite 2 Racing in 2008 before Harmon became the sole owner in 2009 and renamed the team Mike Harmon Racing, its name until 2023 after Michael Clayton Sr. and Gary Keller joined the team as co-owners.

History

NASCAR Xfinity Series
Mike Harmon Racing, briefly known as Elite 2 Racing, has been active in the Xfinity Series since the 2007 season, with the exception of the 2010 season. They have had more than 250 entries over 15 seasons. Since 2011, the team has primarily fielded the No. 74 car and more recently added the No. 47. The highest the team has finished in owner points was 30th, which came in the 2020 season.

Car No. 44 history 
The No. 44 car was fielded for 12 races in MHR's debut year, 2007. Owner, Mike Harmon, was behind the wheel for eight races, Johnny Borneman III for one, and Jennifer Jo Cobb made three attempts. The team failed to qualify for six of the 12 races that they entered.

Car No. 44 results

Car No. 47 history 
In 2017, MHR and Rick Ware Racing partnered to field the No. 17 Dodge at the Johnsonville 180 at Road America. The team chose road course ringer, Nicolas Hammann, to drive the entry.  The team finished 29th after starting 40th. 

Two seasons later, in 2019, MHR again joined with Rick Ware to jointly field the No. 17 car starting in May at Charlotte. The mid-season move came after Rick Ware Racing to field a full-time entry, but decided to scale back. The partnership fielded 15 entries in total for the 2019 season, finishing 44th in owner points.

Though MHR and RWR ended its partnership, the team decided to continue running two cars for the 2020 NXS season. The car was renumbered to No. 47, the inverse of their No. 74 entry.

NASCAR veteran Joe Nemechek handled a majority of the driving duties for the car in the first one-third of the season, while Kyle Weatherman drove a majority of the races in the last two-thirds. Additionally, Bayley Currey, Tim Viens, and Josh Reaume, drove races for the entry. The team finished 34th in owner points.

On August 17, 2020, the vehicle and trailer that carried the race car, pit box, and tool box for the No. 47 was stolen from a Cracker Barrel parking lot in Kingsland, Georgia, on their return trip from a race at Daytona International Speedway. The estimated evaluation  of the stolen items was approximately US$400,000. As of 2022, the vehicle and trailer had not been found, despite a US$10,000 reward.

Weatherman was elevated full-time to the No. 47 car for the 2021 season. He was able to qualify for 30 of 33 races and finish 24th in the driver's points standings and 31st in owner's points.  In an announcement on January 7, 2022, it was made public that Weatherman and MHR had departed ways with no report of a replacement driver.

In 2022, Gray Gaulding attempted to qualify for the 2022 Beef. It's What's for Dinner. 300 at Daytona International Speedway, which he failed to do so. Brennan Poole took over driving duties for the majority of the season.

Car No. 47 results

Car No. 48 history
In 2007, the team fielded the No. 48 car for Harmon for two races at Nashville and Kentucky. He finished 40th and 41st respectively.

Car No. 48 results

Car No. 74 history

Harmon debuted the No. 74 team in 2011 at Auto Club Speedway, start and parking after three laps and finishing 43rd. The next race the No. 74 attempted was at Texas Motor Speedway with J. J. Yeley behind the wheel, who parked the car after five laps. That season, Harmon ran 14 races and Yeley ran two, all of them being start and parks.

The following season, 2012, Harmon continued to start and park the car, with Kevin Lepage, Rick Crawford, David Green and Scott Riggs being brought in for one race each.

During 2013, Harmon began to bring in many new drivers. That season, Harmon himself only drove seven races, with Kevin Lepage, Juan Carlos Blum, Danny Efland, Carl Long and Kevin O'Connell running races. Notably, the team did not start and park in most races they entered that year. O'Connell scored the team their best non-superspeedway finish up to then, a 22nd-place finish at Road America while staying on the lead lap. Harmon also scored their best finish up to then at Daytona, finishing 17th on the lead lap.

Harmon ran most races in 2014, and they again start and parked most times. Kevin Lepage, Mike Wallace, Reuse brothers Bobby and Roger also had seat time. The team's best finish that year was a 24th-place finish at Mid-Ohio with Bobby Reuse, six laps down.

For 2015, Harmon attempted 29 races in the 74, start and parking in 12 races and failing to qualify in two of them, Talladega and Charlotte. The Reuse brothers returned, with Bobby driving at Watkins Glen and Roger driving at Road America. Jordan Anderson drove at Bristol, and Tim Viens drove in the finale race at Homestead-Miami. Harmon scored the team's best finish at Daytona, a 24th-place finish after starting 19th, seven laps down.

In 2017, the car was sponsored by Veterans Motorsports Inc., a company that provides jobs for veterans. As part of the deal, MHR hired veterans to work for the team.

The team had a carousel of drivers in 2018 and 2019, finishing 40th and 34th, respectively, in owner points.

In 2020, Harmon only ran the plate races in the No. 74 to make way for other drivers to drive his car. Joe Nemechek, Bayley Currey and Kyle Weatherman all drove races for the team's entry, with Currey piloting the car in 20 of the 33.

On January 2, 2021, it was announced that Currey would compete full time in the No.74, making it the second full-time entry for MHR for 2021. This would be the first time that the team would attempt to run two full-time drivers. (Currey in the No. 74 and Weatherman in the No. 47)

Currey went on to secure a team-best, top-ten finish, by crossing the line in seventh at Phoenix Raceway. However, 11 races later, he was reduced to a part-time capacity when he was replaced by Jesse Iwuji at Pocono. The other drivers of the No. 74 in 2021, were Dawson Cram, Tim Viens, Carson Ware, C. J. McLaughlin, Gray Gaulding, Mike Harmon, and Ryan Ellis. The team finished 40th in owner points.

On November 22, 2021, NASCAR suspended Ryan Bell, the crew chief of the MHR No. 74 car, for the first six races in 2022 for violating the vehicle testing rule when MHR brought the No. 74 car to a charity event at Rockingham Speedway (a track that was no longer on the Truck Series schedule and therefore unsanctioned by NASCAR) and the car was driven around the track. In addition, the team was given a deduction of 75 owner and driver points for the start of the 2022 season. The team would appeal the penalty and lose, although the 50,000 fine to crew chief Ryan Bell was switched to car owner Mike Harmon. On January 27, 2022, MHR won its final appeal, rescinding Bell's suspension and the monetary fine while still receiving the points deduction.

In 2022, Tim Viens debuted the car at Daytona, but failed to qualify. The No. 74 was not fielded again in 2022, as the team shifted their attention to the No. 47, possibly due to the 75 point hole the No. 74 team had to dig out of.

In 2023, the No. 74 car returned to full-time competition with Ryan Vargas as the primary driver.

Car No. 74 results

Car No. 77 history
In the 2014 race at Mid-Ohio Sports Car Course, MHR fielded a second car, the No. 77, for Roger Reuse to compete in the race against his brother Bobby in the team's No. 74 car. The car was a late entry on the entry list and therefore did not receive any points.

Car No. 77 results

Car No. 84 history
In 2008, the team was renamed Elite 2 Racing, and instead of sharing two numbers with other part-time teams, they used their number, the No. 84 (the No. 48 reversed). Harmon again drove the car in most of the races the team ran, with Carl Long driving at Charlotte in May (although Harmon was originally going to drive the car in that race) and road course ringer Dale Quarterley driving at Montreal and Watkins Glen. Though the team reverted to MHR in 2009, Harmon and Cobb ran the No. 84 entry in that season as well.

Car No. 84 results

NASCAR Camping World Truck Series

Truck No. 42 history
The team debuted their truck series program with the No. 42 in 2009. Harmon drove for four races, though he failed to qualify at Talladega.

Truck No. 49 history
In 2015, the team fielded an additional part-time entry by running the No. 49 truck. Harmon drove at Texas   and Cassie Gannis, attempted to make her series debut at Phoenix but failed to qualify.

Truck No. 74 history
The team debuted the No. 74 truck in 2011, with Harmon as the driver. The team attempted seven races

The following year several drivers got behind the wheel including, Wheeler Boys, Rick Crawford, Brian Weber, Scott Riggs, and Tim Andrews. Harmon himself attempted another seven races in the truck.

Two years later in 2014, Harmon made three starts, with Wendell Chavous making two additional starts at Martinsville and Phoenix and, Jordan Anderson made the final start at Homestead.

In 2015, Anderson returned to the truck for 19 races. He failed to qualify twice at Daytona and Bristol. Paige Decker attempted both Martinsville races, failing to qualify at the spring Martinsville race. Tim Viens made a start at Dover and Stew Hayward made a start at Eldora Speedway. He finished 32nd after an engine failure in the season's only dirt track race.
 
In 2016, Harmon made five starts, but he failed to qualify for three races and withdrew from a race at Talladega. Viens failed to qualify at Atlanta but made the race at New Hampshire. Decker returned to drive the No. 74 at Martinsville. Anderson made a single start at Phoenix.

In 2017, Anderson attempted to make the season opener at Daytona but he failed to qualify. Joe Hudson made a start at Canadian Tire. He finished 27th after a brake failure. Harmon attempted three starts in the truck which included a withdraw from a race at Homestead–Miami Speedway.

In 2018, Harmon made nine starts but he failed to qualify for two races at Martinsville and Texas. He also withdrew from the race at Las Vegas Motor Speedway. B. J. McLeod made one start at Pocono.

Truck No. 84 history

In 2013, the team fielded the No. 84 truck in partnership with Glenden Enterprises. Robert Bruce drove the 84 truck at Martinsville. Harmon made 13 starts in the 84 truck but he failed to qualify for one race at Bristol.

ARCA Menards Series
The team debuted in what was then the ARCA Re/Max Series in 2005 at the July Pocono race with Art Seeger driving the No. 78 car.

Harmon drove the No. 38 for Oostlander Racing full-time in 2006. He bought the team after the first two races of the 2007 season and it became Richardson-Netzloff-Harmon Racing starting at Nashville. He finished the season with one top-10 race finish at Pocono. RNH also partnered with Darrell Basham Racing to field Ricky Gonzalez in their No. 94 car at Milwaukee and Gateway.

References

External links
  (Mike Harmon)
  (Donnie Richardson)
 Mike Harmon Racing website

NASCAR teams
ARCA Menards Series teams
American auto racing teams